Günaydın is a Turkish surname, literally “good morning”.
Notable people with the surname include:

Dilara Buse Günaydın (born 1989), Turkish female swimmer
Engin Günaydın (born 1972), Turkish actor and comedian
Erol Günaydın (born 1933), Turkish actor

It is also a Turkish newspaper,
 Günaydın

Turkish-language surnames